The 2004 Salt Lake County mayoral election was held to elect the Mayor of Salt Lake County, Utah on November 2, 2004, alongside the presidential, House of Representatives, Senate and gubernatorial elections. This marked the second election to the office since the post was created in 2000.

In 2000, Nancy Workman was elected as the first county mayor. However, in June 2004, she came under investigation for hiring two county-paid employees who had worked for her daughter at the Boys and Girls Clubs of South Valley, resulting in her being placed on paid administrative leave on July 9, replaced with Deputy Mayor Alan Dayton.

Democrat Peter Corroon won the election as one of two Democrats to win the county during the election cycle, alongside gubernatorial candidate Scott Matheson Jr., while the county backed Republicans George W. Bush for President and Bob Bennett for Senator.

Candidates

Democratic Party
 Peter Corroon, businessman

Republican Party
 Ellis Ivory, businessman

Dropped out
 Nancy Workman, former County Mayor (2001–2004)

Despite being placed on administrative leave, Workman still remained the Republican candidate and refused to withdraw. However, after revelations that she had paid her daughter's former boyfriend for county computer work that was never done, Salt Lake County GOP voted on October 5 to withdraw support for her, instead supporting Ivory, who until then was running as a write-in candidate. On October 12, Workman filed papers with County Clerk Sherrie Swensen to officially withdraw from the race, including a note from her physician, Philip Roberts, saying she was "disabled" and unable to continue. Swensen rejected the county GOP attempt to certify Ivory as their candidate, forcing the party to hold an emergency central committee meeting and succeeding a week before the election, despite lawsuits from Democratic Party.

Independent
 Merrill Cook, Utah's 2nd congressional district representative 1997–2001

Personal Choice
 F. Joseph Irish

Polling

Results

References

2004 Utah elections
2004 United States mayoral elections
2004 in Utah
2000s in Salt Lake City